Padmaprabha Literary Award for contributions to the field of Malayalam literature is instituted by the Padmaprabha Foundation. A prestigious literary prize in Malayalam, the award was instituted in memory of freedom fighter and socialist Padmaprabha. It carries a purse of Rs 75,000, a gem-studded ring and plaque. The awards are announced every year.

List of winners 

 1996 Unnikrishnan Puthoor
 1997 Ponkunnam Varkey
 1998 M. Achuthan
 1999 M. Leelavathi
 2000 N. P. Muhammed
 2001 Kakkanadan
 2002 Akkitham Achuthan Namboothiri
 2003 K. T. Muhammed
 2004 O. N. V. Kurup
 2005 P. Valsala
 2006 C. Radhakrishnan
 2007 U. A. Khader
 2008 K. Satchidanandan
 2009 N. S. Madhavan
 2010 M. K. Sanu
 2011 Sarah Joseph
 2012 Vijayalakshmi
 2013 C. V. Balakrishnan
 2014 Benyamin
 2015 V. Madhusoodhanan Nair
 2016 Prabha Varma
 2018 Kalpatta Narayanan
 2019 Santhosh Echikkanam
 2020 Sreekumaran Thampi

References

Malayalam literary awards